Ali Suliman (born 1977) is a Palestinian actor. He is known for his work on the series Jack Ryan and the film Paradise Now.

Life and career
Ali was born in Nazareth, Israel. He graduated from Yoram Loewenstein Acting School and started his career in the theater. In 2005, he got the main role in Palestinian film, Paradise Now, which won the Golden Globe Award for Best Foreign Language Film and was nominated for an Academy Award in the same category.

In 2007, he appeared in the movie The Kingdom. He played a lawyer in Lemon Tree (2008), the role of Omar Sadiki in Body of Lies (2008), a young displaced Palestinian in The Time That Remains (2009), a surgeon in The Attack (2013), Gulab in Lone Survivor (2013) and General Qamish in The Looming Tower (2018). In 2018, he played Mousa Bin Suleiman in the Amazon Prime Video action thriller series Jack Ryan.

Selected filmography

Selected television 
 2011 : Homeland
 2011 : The Promise
 2017 : The State
 2018 : Jack Ryan
 2018 : The Looming Tower

Selected theater
 2000 : At The Heart of the See
 2000 : The Wise Nathan
 2001 : A View from the Bridge
 2002 : The Mission
 2002 : Antar
 2002 : The Heart’s Key
 2002 : Waiting for Godot
 2003 : Can-Opener
 2004 : The Glass Menagerie
 2005 : The storm
 2005 : Salome
 2007 : Forget Herostratos by Gregore Goren
 2007 : The Sneeze
 2008 :  The beggarly that exchanged 
 2009 :  I Am Yusuf and This Is My Brother

Awards

References

External links
 

Palestinian male actors
Palestinian male film actors
Living people
Arab citizens of Israel
Israeli male film actors
Israeli people of Palestinian descent
People from Nazareth
1977 births